The 2003 Tushino bombing was a terrorist attack that occurred on July 5, 2003, at Tushino airfield in Moscow, Russia, killing 15 people and injuring up to 60 more.

According to the official version, two Chechen shahidka (Muslim female suicide bombers) committed suicide attacks at the entrance to a rock festival called Krylya (lit. Wings) being held at the Tushino airfield in north-western Moscow. The first bomber, 20-year-old Zulikhan Elikhadzhiyeva, detonated her bomb which only partially exploded, killing only herself. Only a few meters away from where Elikhadzhiyeva had detonated, 26-year-old Zinaida Aliyeva detonated her explosives 15 minutes later, killing 11 people on the spot while at least 60 people were injured, with four of them later dying in hospital. Russian authorities stated that had the suicide bombers been able to enter the airfield, the casualties would have been significantly higher. They opened a criminal investigation into the attack.

The Tushino bombing was part of a string of suicide attacks in Russia that had occurred within the previous four months, killing 165 people in total, in the context of the Second Chechen War.

See also 
 Suicide attacks in the North Caucasus conflict

References 

21st-century mass murder in Russia
Attacks in Russia in 2003
Attacks on music venues
Mass murder in 2003
Operations of the Second Chechen War
Islamic terrorism in Russia
Events in Moscow
Suicide bombing in the Chechen wars
Terrorist incidents in Moscow
Terrorist incidents of the Second Chechen War
Terrorist incidents in Russia in 2003
2003 in Moscow
Islamic terrorist incidents in 2003
July 2003 events in Russia